The Dunera Boys is a 1985 Australian mini series based on the Dunera incident.

Cast
 Bob Hoskins - Morrie Mendellsohn
 Joseph Spano - Alexander Engelhardt
 Warren Mitchell - Mr. Braun
 Joseph Furst - The Baron
 John Meillon - Brigadier Templeton
 Simon Chilvers - Colonel Berry
 Julia Blake - Mum
 Maurie Fields - Corporal Carter
 Alex Menglet - Roth

References

External links

The Dunera Boys Ep 2 at Australian Screen Online
The Dunera Boys Ep 3 at Australian Screen Online

World War II television drama series
1985 television films
1985 films
1980s Australian television miniseries
1985 Australian television series debuts
1985 Australian television series endings
Films directed by Ben Lewin